"High Ball Stepper" is an instrumental track performed by American musician Jack White. It was released as a promotional single from his second studio album, Lazaretto, on April 1, 2014. The song charted in several countries. It was also used for some intros that were used for the US Soccer Team at the 2014 FIFA World Cup in Brazil.

Track listing
Third Man — TMR-272

Charts

Release history

References

2014 songs
Songs written by Jack White